Beate Liebich (born 21 February 1958) is a German middle-distance runner. She competed in the women's 1500 metres at the 1980 Summer Olympics, representing East Germany.

References

1958 births
Living people
Athletes (track and field) at the 1980 Summer Olympics
German female middle-distance runners
Olympic athletes of East Germany
Place of birth missing (living people)
20th-century German women